Brigadier Peter Lambert is an Australian public servant and former senior officer in the Australian Army.

Lambert had a lengthy career with the Australian Defence Force, where he rose to the rank of brigadier, and later worked with the Defence Materiel Organisation (DMO). In January 2013 he joined the Defence Science and Technology Organisation (DSTO) where he was Deputy Chief Defence Scientist (Corporate) and CIO. Following restructures and name changes, he became Chief of Research Services Division of the Defence Science and Technology Group.

References

Year of birth missing (living people)
Living people
Chief information officers
Place of birth missing (living people)
Australian brigadiers
Defence Science and Technology Organisation